The Cirque du Bout du Monde is a steephead valley and cirque in Burgundy, in the département of Côte-d'Or near the vineyards of Beaune.

It is the sole costalorian steephead valley. Major features of the valley are a  waterfall and several caves.

External links

  

Landforms of Côte-d'Or
Bout du Monde
Tourist attractions in Côte-d'Or